The International Journal of Productivity and Performance Management is a peer-reviewed academic journal covering performance management and measurement. The editors-in-chief are Dr Nicky Shaw (Leeds University Business School) and Dr Luisa Huatuco (The York Management School). The journal was established in 1952 and is published by Emerald Group Publishing. It is the official journal of the World Confederation of Productivity Science. The journal is abstracted and indexed in ABI/Inform, Business Source Alumni Edition/Complete/Complete: Government Edition/Corporate/Corporate Plus/Elite/Main Edition/Premier, Cabell's Directory of Publishing Opportunities in Management and Marketing, Education Research Complete/Education Source, Emerald Management Reviews, Ergonomics Abstracts, INSPEC, ProQuest databases, PsycINFO, Scopus, ReadCube Discover, SafetyLit, Technical, Education and Training Abstracts, and TOC Premier (EBSCO).

Ranked: Chartered Association of Business Schools (CABS, UK) Academic Journal Guide, Australian Business Deans Council (ABDC) Quality Journal List, Australian Research Council (ERA Journal List), BFI (Denmark), JourQUAL 2.1 (Germany), NSD (Norway), Polish Scholarly Bibliography (PBN), Qualis, The Publication Forum (Finland), AIDEA (Italy), Clarivate Analytics' Emerging Sources Citation Index (ESCI).

Aims and Scope
The International Journal of Productivity and Performance Management publishes double-blind peer-reviewed papers. The main types include original research and reflective practice papers, though other forms are considered. Each issue includes high-quality content covering all aspects of productivity and performance management from a wide range of international contexts, sectors and applications.
The journal’s distinctiveness flows from: (a) its substantial longevity in the field of productivity and performance management continuing from the previous titles: Time and Motion Study then Work Study, (b) its growth from its roots in industrial engineering and operations management to encompass many other perspectives and (c) its commitment to the practitioner voice, encouraged through reflective practice articles.
The journal’s scope draws from the fields of Operations & Supply Chain Management, Industrial Engineering, Marketing, Economics, Accounting, Human Resource Management and Organizational Behaviour. Coverage includes, but it is not limited to:
-Performance management
-Performance measurement tools & techniques
-Productivity measurement & development
-Organizational design & methods
-Process analysis, engineering & re-engineering
-Quality & business excellence management
-Lean approaches
-Project & programme management

External links 
 
 World Confederation of Productivity Science

Emerald Group Publishing academic journals
English-language journals
Business and management journals
Publications established in 1952
8 times per year journals